Atadenovirus is a genus of viruses, in the family Adenoviridae. Vertebrates serve as natural hosts. There are 10 species in this genus.

Taxonomy
The genus contains the following 10 species:
 Bovine atadenovirus D
 Bovine atadenovirus E
 Deer atadenovirus A
 Duck atadenovirus A
 Lizard atadenovirus A
 Lizard atadenovirus B
 Ovine atadenovirus D
 Possum atadenovirus A
 Psittacine atadenovirus A
 Snake atadenovirus A

Structure
Viruses in Atadenovirus are non-enveloped, with icosahedral geometries, and T=25 symmetry. The diameter is around 90 nm. Genomes are linear and non-segmented, around 30kb in length. The genome codes for 30 proteins.

Life cycle
Viral replication is nuclear. Entry into the host cell is achieved by attachment of the viral fiber glycoproteins to host receptors, which mediates endocytosis. Replication follows the DNA strand displacement model. DNA-templated transcription, with some alternative splicing mechanism is the method of transcription. The virus exits the host cell by nuclear envelope breakdown, viroporins, and lysis. Vertebrates serve as the natural host.

References

External links
 Viralzone: Atadenovirus
 ICTV

Adenoviridae
Virus genera